Jack David Wignall (born 26 September 1981) is an English footballer who plays as a defender, most recently for AFC Sudbury. Wignall has played in the Football League for Colchester United. He is son to former football player and manager Steve Wignall.

Career

Born in Colchester, Wignall progressed through the Colchester United Centre of Excellence, beginning his apprenticeship with the club in 1998. He made his first-team debut for the club in the Football League Trophy, coming on as a substitute for Alan White in the 32nd-minute of the 3–1 defeat to Swansea City on 7 December 1999. He then made his solitary Football League appearance, replacing David Greene after 84 minutes in a 2–1 defeat to Bristol Rovers.

Unable to break into United's first-team the following season, Wignall was released in March 2001, joining Conference club Dagenham & Redbridge, where he made five appearances during the latter stages of the 2000–01 season. After his stint with the Daggers, he moved on to Cambridge City and then Chelmsford City.

Next, Wignall joined Wivenhoe Town where his father, Steve, was assistant manager. He played for Wivenhoe between 2003 and 2007 before signing for AFC Sudbury in March 2007, where he remained until the end of the season. He then joined Heybridge Swifts in August 2007, but transferred to Redbridge a few weeks later. For the 2008–09 season, he joined Needham Market, but left the club in September 2008, signing for Tiptree United, before moving to Harwich & Parkeston in March 2009. He spent a full season with Concord Rangers during 2009–10 before returning to Sudbury. He spent two years with the club, including spending time as first-team coach, but left in January 2012 to help run his parents business in North Wales.

References

1981 births
Living people
Sportspeople from Colchester
English footballers
Association football defenders
Colchester United F.C. players
Dagenham & Redbridge F.C. players
Cambridge City F.C. players
Chelmsford City F.C. players
Wivenhoe Town F.C. players
A.F.C. Sudbury players
Heybridge Swifts F.C. players
Redbridge F.C. players
Needham Market F.C. players
Tiptree United F.C. players
Harwich & Parkeston F.C. players
Concord Rangers F.C. players
English Football League players
National League (English football) players